Hacienda Rosalia, also known as Hacienda Santa Rosalia, is a compound where the ancestral home mansion of Gaston family and the Church of Cartwheels are located. It is situated in Manapla, Negros Occidental, Philippines. The mansion was built in 1930s.

History

Hacienda Santa Rosalia is a sugar plantation owned by Jose Gaston, one of the sons of Victor Gaston, a sugar planter of Negros. He was married to Consuelo Azcona and had 8 children. The Gaston Mansion was built in the 1930s. It is set in lush, verdant and gorgeous garden of flowers, shrubs, trees, potted palms and herbs. Within the grounds are a fresh water swimming pool (used as hiding place during World War II), a Victorian fountain, a basketball court, a windmill, and a time-worn shoe house (which was used before as a playground). The Chapel of the Cartwheels is also situated a few meters away from the ancestral home. The Gaston family originated from the Frenchman Yves Leopold Germain Gaston. He is credited as the first to commercially produce cane sugar, the primary product of the province.

Media
Hacienda Rosalia is also been used as a setting and location shoot for films most notable of which is the 1981 epic Oro, Plata, Mata.

House of Gaston
The house of Yves Leopold Germain Gaston's eldest son Victor in Silay City is now a museum open to the public and is officially called the Balay Negrense (Hiligaynon, "The Negrense House").

See also
 Balay Negrense
 The Ruins (mansion)
 Silliman Hall
 Dizon-Ramos Museum
 Museo Negrense de La Salle
 Dr. Jose Corteza Locsin Ancestral House

References

Sugar plantations in the Philippines
Buildings and structures in Negros Occidental
Tourist attractions in Negros Occidental